Roy James Barratt (3 May 1942 – 19 January 1995) was an English cricketer who appeared in 70 first-class matches for Leicestershire between 1961 and 1970.

Barratt was a left-arm slow orthodox spin bowler with a low, almost round-arm action, and a tail-end left-handed batsman, known as "Basher" for his uninhibited approach to batting. He made his first-class debut for Leicestershire on 21 June 1961 in the 1961 County Championship. His best bowling figures in an innings were 7 for 35 against Gloucestershire in 1969. His best match figures were 10 for 90 against Hampshire in 1965, when he took 5 for 45 in each innings.

He was born in Aylestone, Leicester, and died at Coalville, Leicestershire, after suffering a heart attack. His family owned a building business. Their projects included the pavilion at Leicestershire's home ground at Grace Road, which they built during Barratt's playing career with the club; he took part in the construction work.

References

External links 
 

1942 births
1995 deaths
English cricketers
Leicestershire cricketers
People from Aylestone
Cricketers from Leicester